Thorae or Thorai was a deme of ancient Attica, located a little south of Anagyrus.

The site of Thorae is tentatively located at Agios Demetrios Trapuria.

References

Populated places in ancient Attica
Former populated places in Greece
Demoi